Lilian Margaret Passmore Sanderson (22 February 1925 – 16 September 1996) was an English teacher and educationalist who became known for her research on female genital mutilation, particularly in Sudan. She was the author of Against the Mutilation of Women: The Struggle Against Unnecessary Suffering (1981) and Female Genital Mutilation, Excision and Infibulation: A Bibliography (1986).

Early life and education
Born Lilian Passmore, Sanderson attended Barnstaple Girls' Grammar  School in Devon, before graduating in 1947 with a BA (as an external degree) from Exeter University College. In 1948 she obtained a Diploma of Education (DipEd), also from Exeter, and in 1962 an MA from the University of London for a thesis entitled "A history of education in the Sudan with special reference to the development of girls' schools". In 1966 she was awarded a PhD, also by the University of London; her thesis was "Education in the southern Sudan, 1898–1948".

Career
After obtaining her diploma from Exeter, Sanderson taught at a girls' school in High Wycombe, then in 1951 accepted a post in Egypt to teach at the English Girls' College in Alexandria. From 1953 she taught at Omdurman Girls' Secondary School in Omdurman, Sudan, and from 1954 to 1958 served as headmistress of Omdurman Intermediate School. From then until 1962, she was headmistress at Khartoum Girls' Secondary School; she wrote that the school represented "the greatest single development in government secondary education for girls in the Sudan". From 1962 she taught for one year at the University of Khartoum.

Sanderson left Sudan in 1964, after which she taught at Buckinghamshire College of Higher Education in Chalfont St Giles until 1980 and campaigned to end FGM. In 1980 she wrote a report for the University of London on "Education in the Middle East with special reference to the Sudan, Egypt and education for the eradication of female genital mutilation" and she worked with Asma El Dareer, author of a classic study on FGM in Sudan, Woman, Why Do You Weep? (1982).

Personal life
In May 1960 Sanderson married George Neville Sanderson, with whom she wrote Education, Religion and Politics in Southern Sudan, 1899–1964 (1981). The couple had three children. She died of cancer in 1996.

Selected works

References

1925 births
1996 deaths
20th-century British women writers
Activists against female genital mutilation
Alumni of the University of Exeter
Alumni of the University of London
Academics of Buckinghamshire New University
Academic staff of the University of Khartoum